The Ship of Souls was a 1925 western novel by Emerson Hough, published after his death. It included 16 illustrations by WHD Koerner. It was made into a 1925 silent 3-D film of the same name, The Ship of Souls.

References

External links
 

1925 American novels
Western (genre) novels